Pimpri Chinchwad College of Engineering is an autonomous engineering college in the city of Pune, India, established in the year 1999.

Departments 
The Undergraduate academic programs offered in PCCOE are Mechanical Engineering, Electronics and Telecommunication Engineering, Computer Engineering, Information Technology, Civil Engineering along with postgraduate courses in Mechanical Heat Power and Design, Computer Engineering, Electronics Engineering (VLSI), Information Technology and Civil Engineering (Construction Management). The Management Programs MCA and MBA are also offered for students after graduation.

Rankings

The National Institutional Ranking Framework (NIRF) ranked it 197 among engineering colleges in 2020.

Technical Events 
To provide a platform for budding engineers to showcase their technical abilities and knowledge PCCOE organizes intercollegiate events "TECHLLIGENT" and "SPECTRUM".  SPECTRUM is a unique event in SPPU for First-Year Engineering Students. TECHLLIGENT consists of events and competitions related to models, projects, papers, demonstrations, and coding. Students of PCCOE have active participation in international level competitions like "ROBOCON", 'SAE BAJA', 'Supra', 'ESVC3000', ACM ICPC, and Smart India Hackathon (SIH).
An event called "ZEST" is organized by the Department of MBA.

See also
 List of educational institutions in Pune

References

External links 
 

Engineering colleges in Maharashtra
Colleges affiliated to Savitribai Phule Pune University
Universities and colleges in Pune
Education in Pimpri-Chinchwad
Educational institutions established in 1999
1999 establishments in Maharashtra